Cheng Ji or Ji Cheng may refer to:

People with the surname Cheng
 Cheng Ji (Shu Han) (died 222), Han dynasty military officer who later served Shu Han during the Three Kingdoms period
 Cheng Ji (Wuyue) (847–913), Tang dynasty military officer who later served the Wuyue kingdom during the Five Dynasties period
 Cheng Ji (成濟), a Cao Wei military officer in the Three Kingdoms period. He assassinated Cao Mao, the fourth Wei emperor. See Coup of Cao Mao.

People with the surname Ji
Ji Cheng (Ming dynasty) (1582–1642), Ming dynasty garden designer
Ji Cheng (cyclist) (born 1987), Chinese cyclist